Handley was a town in Tarrant County, Texas United States. It is located between downtown Fort Worth and Arlington along State Highway 180, and includes the Central Handley Historic District. It is now a part of Fort Worth.

History

Handley was established in 1884 by retired Confederate Major James Madison Handley of Georgia. Handley created a plantation just seven miles from the center of Fort Worth on land that was included in the Sara Gray Jennings Survey of 1856, and a very small community began to grow around him to the west. According to the Fort Worth Gazette newspaper of 1888, the most that could be said for the area was that it was good for hunting foxes. By 1901 Handley had 12 houses and 80 residents.

Handley as a town began to grow when the Northern Texas Traction Company bought land in the southern part of the community where it developed a holiday resort called Lake Erie. The company developed its lake and added a roller skate rink, a dance hall, restaurant and rides on a pier above the water.

Interurban
In 1902 the Northern Texas Traction Company linked the city of Dallas to the east and the city of Fort Worth to the west with its own electric interurban streetcar line. In 1905 the street cars were moving at 8 mph, but by 1923 the speed had picked up to 65 mph.

Annexed by Fort Worth
In 1946 the city of Fort Worth annexed Handley as a community and its independence came to an end. In that year it had 510 school students and a total population of around 1,000. Fort Worth had a population of well over 100,000 residents.

Today
After years of neglect The Historic Handley Development Corporation has now revived a retro-historic version of Handley. Its once famous "Lake Erie" is no more, having been absorbed by the northern part of Lake Arlington, the street cars and their rail lines disappeared long ago and the Traction Company power station is now operated by Exelon.

Its one and two story frame homes are engulfed in trees that populate the neighborhood formed by Meadowbrook Drive to the north, Hitson Lane to the east, Lancaster Avenue to the south and Loop 820 to the west.

Each year the HHDC hosts the Handley Street Fest and Car Show the 2nd Saturday of October.  
The HHDC is currently developing the Historic Handley Railroad Museum at the corner of Handley Drive and East Lancaster Avenue.  They are already in possession of a restored Union Pacific Caboose and hope to add other cars soon, and will also be opening a museum displaying many pieces of railroad history.

External links 
 

History of Fort Worth, Texas
Neighborhoods in Fort Worth, Texas
Former cities in Texas